John Singer may refer to:

Seymour Jonathan Singer (1924–2017), cell biologist and author
John Singer (homeschooler) (1931–1979), American killed in a standoff over homeschooling
John Singer (actor) (1923–1987), English actor
John Webb Singer (1819-1904), British businessman
John Singer, a mute character in Carson McCullers' novel The Heart Is a Lonely Hunter (1940)

See also
Jonathan Singer (disambiguation)
John Singer Sargent